Johnny "Nipper" Cusick (27 January 1916 – 1 March 1990) was an English professional bantam/feather/light/welterweight boxer of the 1930s and 1940s who won the British Boxing Board of Control (BBBofC) Northern (England) Area featherweight title, BBBofC British featherweight title, and British Empire featherweight title. Welterweight. Johnny Cusick was managed by John Bennett.

References

External links

Image - Johnny Cusick

1916 births
Bantamweight boxers
English male boxers
Featherweight boxers
Lightweight boxers
People from Hulme
Place of death missing
Boxers from Manchester
Welterweight boxers
1990 deaths